Enhanced water is a category of beverages that are marketed as water with added ingredients, such as natural or artificial flavors, sugar, sweeteners, vitamins and minerals. Most enhanced waters are lower in calories than non-diet soft drinks. 

PepsiCo, The Coca-Cola Company and other companies market enhanced water. The marketing usually capitalizes on the healthy image of water combined with the perceived health and taste. 
Bottled water was introduced to the United States by television commercial in 1977. After the television commercial, bottled water sales increased by 3,000 percent from the year 1976 to the year 1979. In the year 2004, Americans spent $9 billion on bottled water. Many companies produce enhanced water in the United States. In 2001, flavored and enhanced water sales estimated $80 million, and 2002 proved even more successful with $245 million in sales. The U.S. wholesale market for enhanced water was $170 million in 2004.

Enhanced waters vary from zero-calorie beverages certified organic and flavored with natural herb extracts, such as Ayala's Herbal Water, to the Glaceau brands of beverages owned by The Coca-Cola Company. In May 2007 Coca-Cola bought Energy Brands, the maker of Glacéau Vitaminwater, at a cost of $4.1 billion to narrow its gap with competitor PepsiCo. This was the largest acquisition in the company's history. PepsiCo owns several brands of enhanced water such as SoBe, Propel Fitness Water, and Aquafina Flavorsplash. Coca-Cola owns the brands smartwater, vitaminwater and Dasani.

Brands

Ingredients
Ingredients used as enhancements in the water include hydroxycitric acid, chromium picolinate, epigallocatechin gallate, potassium, vitamin C, vitamin B6 and vitamin B12.

See also 
 Drink mix
 Sports drink

References 

Soft drinks